Helen Levitt (August 31, 1913 – March 29, 2009) was an American photographer and cinematographer. She was particularly noted for her street photography around New York City. David Levi Strauss described her as "the most celebrated and least known photographer of her time."

A retrospective exhibition of Levitt's work, In the Street, is showing at The Photographers' Gallery in London from October 2021 to February 2022.

Early life and education
Levitt was born in Bensonhurst, Brooklyn, New York, the daughter of May (Kane), and Sam Levitt. Her father and maternal grandparents were Russian Jewish immigrants. She went to New Utrecht High School but dropped out in 1931.

Work in photography
She began photography when she was eighteen and in 1931 she learned how to develop photos in the darkroom when she began working for J. Florian Mitchell, a commercial portrait photographer in the Bronx. She also attended many classes and events hosted by the Manhattan Film and Photography League. This was also around the time she was exposed to the work of Henri Cartier-Bresson at the Julien Levy Gallery, who she  was also able to meet through the league. His work became a major influence for her photography as it inspired her to change from her more journalistic and commercial approach to photography to a more personal one.

In 1936, she purchased a Leica camera (a 35 mm range-finder camera). While teaching art classes to children in 1937 for New York City's Federal Art Project, Levitt became intrigued with the transitory chalk drawings that were part of the New York children's street culture of the time.  She began to photograph these chalk drawings, as well as the children who made them for her own creative assignment with the Federal Art Project. They were ultimately published in 1987 as In The Street: chalk drawings and messages, New York City 1938–1948.

She continued taking more street photographs mainly in East Harlem but also in the Garment District and on the Lower East Side, all in Manhattan. During the 1930s to 1940s, the lack of air conditioning meant people were outside more, which invested her in street photography. Her work was first published in Fortune magazine's July 1939 issue. The new photography section of the Museum of Modern Art, New York included Levitt's work in its inaugural exhibition in July 1939.  In 1941, she visited Mexico City with author James Agee and took photos of the area. In 1943, Nancy Newhall curated her first solo exhibition Helen Levitt: Photographs of Children.

In 1959 and 1960, she received two grants from the Guggenheim Foundation for her pioneering work in color photography. In 1965 she published her first major collection, A Way of Seeing. Much of her work in color from 1959 to 1960 was stolen in a 1970 burglary of her East 12th Street apartment. The remaining photos, and others taken in the following years, can be seen in the 2005 book Slide Show: The Color Photographs of Helen Levitt. A second solo exhibit, Projects: Helen Levitt in Color, was held at the Museum of Modern Art, New York in 1974. Her next major shows were in the 1960s; Amanda Hopkinson suggests that this second wave of recognition was related to the feminist rediscovery of women's creative achievements. In 1976, she was a Photography Fellow of the National Endowment for the Arts.

Levitt lived in New York City and remained active as a photographer for nearly 70 years. However, she expressed lament at the change of New York City scenery:

"I go where there's a lot of activity. Children used to be outside. Now the streets are empty. People are indoors looking at television or something."

Work in film making 
In the late 1940s, Levitt made two documentary films with Janice Loeb and James Agee: In the Street (1948) and The Quiet One (1948). Levitt, along with Loeb and Sidney Meyers, received an Academy Award nomination for The Quiet One. Levitt was active in film making for nearly 25 years; her final film credit is as an editor for John Cohen's documentary The End of an Old Song (1972). Levitt's other film credits include the cinematography on The Savage Eye (1960), which was produced by Ben Maddow, Meyers, and Joseph Strick, and also as an assistant director for Strick and Maddow's film version of Genet's play The Balcony (1963). In her 1991 biographical essay, Maria Hambourg wrote that Levitt "has all but disinherited this part of her work." In 2012 Deane Williams published a comprehensive overview of Levitt's films in Senses of Cinema.

Style and themes 
Helen Levitt was most well known and celebrated for her work taking pictures of children playing in the streets. She also focused her work in areas of Harlem and the Lower East side with minority populations.  There is a constant motif of children playing games in her work. She stepped away from the normal practice set by other established photographers at the time of giving a journalistic depiction of suffering. She instead chose to show the world from the perspective of children from taking pictures of their chalk art. She usually positions the camera and styles the photo in a way that gives the focus of her photography power. Her choice to display children playing in the street and explore street photography, fights against what was going on at the time. Legislation being passed in New York at the time was limiting many of the working classes access to these public spaces. Laws were passed that directly targeted these communities in an attempt to control them. New bans on noise targeted working class and minority communities. There was a movement to also try to keep children from playing on the street, believing it is unsafe for them out there. Instead, it encouraged safe new areas that were usually built more in upper and middle class areas. Helen Levitt instead explored the narrative of those who lived in these areas and played in these streets as a way to empower the subjects of her photos.

Personal life and death 
She had to give up making her own prints in the 1990s due to sciatica, which also made standing and carrying her Leica difficult, causing her to switch to a small, automatic Contax. She was born with Ménière's syndrome, an inner-ear disorder that caused her to "[feel] wobbly all [her] life." She also had a near-fatal case of pneumonia in the 1950s. Levitt lived a personal and quiet life. She seldom gave interviews and was generally very introverted. She never married, living alone with her yellow tabby Blinky. Levitt died in her sleep on March 29, 2009, at the age of 95.

Exhibitions

Solo exhibitions
Helen Levitt: Photographs of Children, Museum of Modern Art, New York, 1943. Curated by Nancy Newhall.
Projects: Helen Levitt in Color, Museum of Modern Art, New York, 1974.
 Street Portrait: The Photographs of Helen Levitt Museum of Fine Arts, Boston, 1983
 Moderna Museet, Stockholm, 1985. A retrospective.
 The Photographers' Gallery, London, 1988. A retrospective.
 San Francisco Museum of Modern Art, 1991 then toured nationally 1991–1993. A retrospective.
 , Spain, 1994 and toured. A retrospective.
 International Center of Photography, New York, 1997. A retrospective.
 Centre national de la photographie, Paris, 2001. A retrospective.
 Henri Cartier-Bresson Foundation, Paris, 2007. A retrospective.
 Foam Fotografiemuseum Amsterdam, 2008. A retrospective.
 Sprengel Museum, Hannover, 2008 (accompanied her award for the Spectrum International Photography Prize). A retrospective.
 PHotoEspaña, Madrid, 2010 and toured. A retrospective.
 Albertina Museum, Vienna, 2018. A retrospective.
 In the Street, The Photographers' Gallery, London, 2021/22. A retrospective.

Group exhibitions
Museum of Modern Art, New York, 1939
Fondation Henri Cartier-Bresson, Paris, 2023. Henri Cartier-Bresson, Helen Levitt - Mexico.

Publications

Films
 In the Street (1948): cinematographer and editor
 The Quiet One (1948): cinematographer and writer
 The Stairs (1950): producer
 The Savage Eye (1960): cinematographer
 The Balcony (1963): assistant director
 An Affair of the Skin (1963): co-producer with Ben Maddow
 In the Year of the Pig (1968): co-editor with Hannah Moreinis
 The End of an Old Song (1972): editor

Awards
2008: Francis J. Greenburger Award for excellence in the arts

References

Further reading
  Radio program featuring an interview with Levitt.
  Critical study of ten of Levitt's photographs. Dikant also discusses the influences on Levitt, including Henri Cartier-Bresson, Ben Shahn, and Walker Evans.
 
  Reviews One, two, three, more.

External links

 Helen Levitt: New York Streets 1938 to 1990s at LensCulture
 . Note that there is occasionally confusion of Levitt's film credits with those of Helen Slote Levitt.

Street photographers
1913 births
2009 deaths
20th-century American photographers
20th-century American women photographers
American cinematographers
American people of Russian-Jewish descent
People from Bensonhurst, Brooklyn
People with Ménière's Disease
Photographers from New York (state)
Photography in Mexico
21st-century American women